The Pramms Memorial is a Listed flat horse race in Sweden open to thoroughbreds aged four years or older. It is run over a distance of 1,730 metres (1 mile and 132 yards) at Jägersro in May.

History
The event is named in memory of Per-Erik Pramm, a successful owner-breeder in Sweden. It was established in 1984, and the first running was won by Avrio.

For a period the Pramms Memorial held Listed status. It was promoted to Group 3 level in 2012. and relegated back to Listed level in 2016.

Unusually for a Group or Listed race in Europe, the Pramms Memorial is run on a dirt track.

Records
Most successful horse (2 wins):
 Red Hero – 1989, 1991
 Banzhaf – 1998, 1999
 Exbourne's Wish – 2001, 2002
 Luca Brasi – 2010, 2011
 Duca di Como - 2020, 2022

Leading jockey (4 wins):
 Elione Chaves - Luca Brasi (2011), Silver Ocean (2015), Duca di Como (2020, 2022)

Leading trainer (3 wins):
 Arnfinn Lund – Philidor (1995), Exbourne's Wish (2001, 2002)
 Francisco Castro – Mandrake el Mago (2003), Luca Brasi (2010, 2011)
 Niels Petersen - Salt Track (2007), Plantaganet (2013), Silver Ocean (2015)

Winners

See also

 List of Scandinavian flat horse races

References

 Racing Post:
 galopp-sieger.de – Pramms Memorial.
 horseracingintfed.com – International Federation of Horseracing Authorities – Pramms Memorial (2015).
 jagersro.se – Pramms Memorial.
 pedigreequery.com – Pramms Memorial – Jägersro.

Open mile category horse races
Sport in Malmö
Horse races in Sweden
1984 establishments in Sweden
Recurring sporting events established in 1984
Spring (season) events in Sweden